Barssia is a genus of ascomycete fungus of the family Helvellaceae. The widespread genus contains two species.

References

External links

Pezizales
Pezizales genera